Elmohardyia is a genus of flies in the family Pipunculidae.

Species
Elmohardyia adunca Rafael & Menezes, 1999
Elmohardyia amazona (Hardy, 1950)
Elmohardyia angustifrons (Becker, 1900)
Elmohardyia aquinoi Menezes & Rafael, 1997
Elmohardyia argentata (Hardy, 1954)
Elmohardyia argentocincta Rafael, 1988
Elmohardyia argyrogaster Rafael, 1988
Elmohardyia arnaudi Rafael, 1988
Elmohardyia arx Rafael, 1988
Elmohardyia atlantica (Hough, 1899)
Elmohardyia bifida Rafael & Menezes, 1999
Elmohardyia carrerai (Hardy, 1950)
Elmohardyia cearensis Marques & Rafael, 2015
Elmohardyia cheliformis Marques & Rafael, 2015
Elmohardyia circulus Rafael, 1988
Elmohardyia concava Menezes & Rafael, 1997
Elmohardyia conchulata Menezes & Rafael, 1996
Elmohardyia congruens (Hardy, 1950)
Elmohardyia costaricana Rafael & Menezes, 1999
Elmohardyia denigrata Rafael, 1988
Elmohardyia distincta Marques & Rafael, 2015
Elmohardyia doelloi (Shannon, 1927)
Elmohardyia echinata Menezes & Rafael, 1997
Elmohardyia eminula (Hardy, 1965)
Elmohardyia exserta (Hardy, 1965)
Elmohardyia formosa Marques & Rafael, 2015
Elmohardyia galeata Rafael & Menezes, 1999
Elmohardyia gowdeyi (Curran, 1928)
Elmohardyia guimaraesi Rafael, 1988
Elmohardyia hispida Menezes & Rafael, 1997
Elmohardyia immaculata Menezes & Rafael, 1997
Elmohardyia inepta (Hardy, 1954)
Elmohardyia lanei (Hardy, 1965)
Elmohardyia limeirai Marques & Rafael, 2015
Elmohardyia lindneri (Collin, 1931)
Elmohardyia maculata Rafael & Menezes, 1999
Elmohardyia manaos Menezes & Rafael, 1996
Elmohardyia martae Marques & Rafael, 2015
Elmohardyia merga Rafael, 1988
Elmohardyia nicaraguensis Rafael, 2004
Elmohardyia oriximinaensis Menezes & Rafael, 1997
Elmohardyia papaveroi Rafael, 1988
Elmohardyia parva Menezes & Rafael, 1997
Elmohardyia potiguar Marques & Rafael, 2015
Elmohardyia praecipua Rafael & Rosa, 1992
Elmohardyia quadricornis Marques & Rafael, 2015
Elmohardyia replicata (Hardy, 1948)
Elmohardyia reversa Rafael, 1988
Elmohardyia roraimensis Rafael & Rosa, 1992
Elmohardyia rosalinae Marques & Rafael, 2015
Elmohardyia rosalyae Menezes & Rafael, 1997
Elmohardyia scoliostylis (Hardy, 1965)
Elmohardyia spatulata Rafael, 1988
Elmohardyia spuria Rafael, 1988
Elmohardyia subnitella (Hardy, 1965)
Elmohardyia subtilis Menezes & Rafael, 1997
Elmohardyia tingomariae Rafael, 1988
Elmohardyia tricuspis Menezes & Rafael, 1997
Elmohardyia trinidadensis (Hardy, 1948)
Elmohardyia tuberosa Rafael, 1988
Elmohardyia valida Menezes & Rafael, 1997

References

Pipunculidae
Brachycera genera
Diptera of North America
Diptera of South America